The  is a railway line in Toyokawa, Aichi, Japan, operated by the private railway operator Nagoya Railroad (Meitetsu). The line connects Kō Station in the western part of Toyokawa with Toyokawa-inari Station in the eastern part of Toyokawa. The line is unique in the Meitetsu system in being one of a handful of heavy rail lines nationwide that fall under the Tramway Law. Another vestige of its past as a street railway could be seen in its right of way, which, despite being clearly segregated, partly lies in a road median.

Stations
All services stop at all stations.

History
The Kō to Shiyakusho-mae (now Suwachō) section was opened in 1945, electrified at 600 V DC, to serve a Japanese Navy shipyard. The voltage was increased to 1,500 V DC in 1953, and the following year the line was extended to Toyokawa-inari.

References

This article incorporates material from the corresponding article in the Japanese Wikipedia.

Toyokawa Line
Rail transport in Aichi Prefecture
Railway lines opened in 1954
1067 mm gauge railways in Japan